Hillborough is an area of eastern Herne Bay in Kent, England. The population is included in the Reculver ward of Herne Bay.

External links

Herne Bay, Kent